Fotis Pantekidis (born 2 April 1997) is a Greek professional footballer who plays as a left back for Super League 2 club Panserraikos.

References

External links

1997 births
Living people
Greek footballers
Association football defenders
Greece youth international footballers
Super League Greece players
PAOK FC players
Panserraikos F.C. players
Footballers from Ptolemaida